The 1997–98 National League 2 North was the eleventh full season of rugby union within the fourth tier (north) of the English league system, previously known as Division 4 North, and was the first to be sponsored by Jewson who replaced former sponsor Courage.  It is counterpart to National League 2 South, which covers the southern half of the country.

The title battle was keenly contested between Birmingham & Solihull and Manchester but in the end it was the West Midlands side that was triumphant, finishing two points clear to finish as champions.  Both clubs would gain promotion to the 1998–99 National League 1.  There was no relegation this season in order to prevent an imbalance of teams in the leagues due to RFU changes for the following season which would see tier 2 increased from 12 to 14 teams and tier 3 reduced from 16 to 14 teams.

Structure

Each team played home and away matches against each of the other teams, playing a total of twenty-six matches each. The league champions and runners up were promoted to National League 1.  There was no relegation this season due to changes higher up in the English league system.

Participating teams and locations

League table

Sponsorship
National League 2 North is part of the Jewson National Leagues is sponsored by Jewson.  It was the first year they would sponsor the league.

References

N4
National League 2 North